Reed Township is one of the fifteen townships of Seneca County, Ohio, United States.  The 2020 census found 738 people in the township.

Geography
Located in the eastern part of the county, it borders the following townships:
Thompson Township – north
Sherman Township, Huron County – northeast
Norwich Township, Huron County – southeast
Venice Township – south
Bloom Township – southwest corner
Scipio Township – west
Adams Township – northwest corner

No municipalities are located in Reed Township, but it does contain the unincorporated community of West Lodi.

Name and history
Reed Township was organized in 1826, and named in honor of Seth Reed (or Seth Read), a pioneer settler. It is the only Reed Township statewide.

Omar Chapel is a historical property in Reed Township which once was a stop on the Underground Railroad. It was completed in 1843 and is listed on the National Register of Historic Places.

Government
The township is governed by a three-member board of trustees, who are elected in November of odd-numbered years to a four-year term beginning on the following January 1. Two are elected in the year after the presidential election and one is elected in the year before it. There is also an elected township fiscal officer, who serves a four-year term beginning on April 1 of the year after the election, which is held in November of the year before the presidential election. Vacancies in the fiscal officership or on the board of trustees are filled by the remaining trustees.

References

External links
County website

Townships in Seneca County, Ohio
Townships in Ohio
Populated places established in 1826
1826 establishments in Ohio